Shirah Ki (also Romanized as Shīrah Kī; also known as Shīrakī) is a village in Koreh Soni Rural District, in the Central District of Salmas County, West Azerbaijan Province, Iran. At the 2006 census, its population was 542, in 101 families.

References 

Populated places in Salmas County